The 2020 Formula Nordic season was the eighth season of the single-seater championship, and the second independent of the STCC branding, following the formation of the series' own association in the wake of the STCC promoter's bankruptcy in 2018. 
Formula Nordic continued to use the previous Formula Renault 1.6 chassis and engines, as it used to go under the name of Formula Renault 1.6 Nordic before Renault Sport dropped its support for the 3.5 and 1.6 classes in late 2015. 
The season began on 19 July at Falkenbergs Motorbana and concluded on 10 October at Ring Knutstorp after six rounds, with Joel Granfors taking both Nordic Cup and JSM titles.

Drivers and teams

Race calendar and results 

The season started on the 19 July at Falkenbergs Motorbana and concluded on 10 October at Ring Knutstorp after six rounds, often supported by the Porsche Carrera Cup Scandinavia and the TCR Scandinavia, the successor to the STCC, as well as various GT series. Like the previous season, the use of reversed grid races for the final race of the weekend, where the top 6 were inverted, was continued. Due to the COVID-19 pandemic and the resulting travel restrictions put in place, this was the first season since 2016 that Rudskogen would not feature on the calendar.

Footnotes

Championship standings 

 Qualifying points system

Points are awarded to the top 5 fastest qualifying times.

 Race points system

Points are awarded to the top 10 classified finishers, no points are offered for fastest lap. 

Two championships are held, the Junior Svenskt Mästerskap (JSM) for drivers under 26 years old holding a Swedish driver license, and the Formula Nordic Cup, the latter serving as the overall championship.

Formula Nordic Drivers' Championship (Nordic Cup and JSM)

References

External links 

 Official website

Formula Nordic
Formula Renault
 Nordic